The 2022 IBA Women's World Boxing Championships (the 12th edition of the championships) was held in Istanbul, Turkey from 8 to 20 May 2022.

Medal winners were awarded prize money; gold medallists earn $100,000, silver medallists $50,000, and bronze medallists $25,000. The overall prize fund was $2.4 million.

The programme was extended from 10 to 12 weight categories. Algeria, Kosovo, Lithuania, Mozambique, Spain and Uzbekistan won their first medals at the Women's World Boxing Championships.

Schedule
All times are local (UTC+3).

Medal summary

Medal table

Medal events

Participating nations
310 athletes from 72 countries and the IBA Fair Chance Team will participate in the championships:

  (4)
  (5)
  (4)
  (10)
  (1)
  (2)
  (4)
  (6)
  (1)
  (4)
  (1)
  (1)
  (1)
  (7)
  (4)
  (4)
  (5)
  (3)
  (2)
  (4)
  Fair Chance Team (2)
  (2)
  (5)
  (7)
  (2)
  (1)
  (1)
  (4)
  (12)
  (9)
  (8)
  (8)
  (12)
  (10)
  (1)
  (1)
  (1)
  (1)
  (3)
  (1)
  (3)
  (9)
  (6)
  (2)
  (4)
  (1)
  (1)
  (1)
  (1)
  (8)
  (5)
  (5)
  (1)
  (2)
  (6)
  (1)
  (1)
  (1)
  (8)
  (10)
  (5)
  (2)
  (4)
  (6)
  (1)
  (2)
  (12) (Host)
  (12)
  (8)
  (10)
  (5)
  (1)
  (2)

 Belarusian and Russian boxers were not allowed to compete at the event after a ban as a result of the Russian invasion of Ukraine.

References

External links
IBA website
Results book

 
2022
IBA
IBA Women's World Boxing Championships
International boxing competitions hosted by Turkey
Sports competitions in Istanbul
IBA Women's World Boxing Championships
Başakşehir
Sports events affected by the 2022 Russian invasion of Ukraine